In mathematics, a differentiable function of one real variable is a function whose derivative exists at each point in its domain. In other words, the graph of a differentiable function has a non-vertical tangent line at each interior point in its domain. A differentiable function is smooth (the function is locally well approximated as a linear function at each interior point) and does not contain any break, angle, or cusp.

If  is an interior point in the domain of a function , then  is said to be differentiable at  if the derivative  exists. Generally speaking,  is said to be of class  if its first  derivatives  exist and are continuous over the domain of the function .

Differentiability of real functions of one variable

A function , defined on an open set , is said to be differentiable at  if the derivative
 
exists.

A continuous function is not necessarily differentiable, but a differentiable function is necessarily continuous (at every point where it is differentiable) as being shown below (in the section Differentiability and continuity). A function is said to be continuously differentiable if its derivative is also a continuous function; there exists a function that is differentiable but not continuously differentiable as being shown below (in the section Differentiability classes).

Differentiability and continuity

In particular, any differentiable function must be continuous at every point in its domain. The converse does not hold: a continuous function need not be differentiable. For example, a function with a bend, cusp, or vertical tangent may be continuous, but fails to be differentiable at the location of the anomaly.

Most functions that occur in practice have derivatives at all points or at almost every point. However, a result of Stefan Banach states that the set of functions that have a derivative at some point is a meagre set in the space of all continuous functions. Informally, this means that differentiable functions are very atypical among continuous functions. The first known example of a function that is continuous everywhere but differentiable nowhere is the Weierstrass function.

Differentiability classes 

A function  is said to be  if the derivative  exists and is itself a continuous function. Although the derivative of a differentiable function never has a jump discontinuity, it is possible for the derivative to have an essential discontinuity. For example, the function

is differentiable at 0, since

exists. However, for  differentiation rules imply

which has no limit as  Thus, this example shows the existence of a function that is differentiable but not continuously differentiable (i.e., the derivative is not a continuous function). Nevertheless, Darboux's theorem implies that the derivative of any function satisfies the conclusion of the intermediate value theorem.

Similarly to how continuous functions are said to be of  continuously differentiable functions are sometimes said to be of  A function is of  if the first and second derivative of the function both exist and are continuous. More generally, a function is said to be of  if the first  derivatives  all exist and are continuous. If derivatives  exist for all positive integers  the function is smooth or equivalently, of

Differentiability in higher dimensions

A function of several real variables  is said to be differentiable at a point  if there exists a linear map  such that

A similar formulation of the higher-dimensional derivative is provided by the fundamental increment lemma found in single-variable calculus.

If all the partial derivatives of a function exist in a neighborhood of a point  and are continuous at the point , then the function is differentiable at that point .

However, the existence of the partial derivatives (or even of all the directional derivatives) does not guarantee that a function is differentiable at a point. For example, the function  defined by

For a continuous example, the function

Differentiability in complex analysis

In complex analysis, complex-differentiability is defined using the same definition as single-variable real functions. This is allowed by the possibility of dividing complex numbers. So, a function  is said to be differentiable at  when

Although this definition looks similar to the differentiability of single-variable real functions, it is however a more restrictive condition. A function , that is complex-differentiable at a point  is automatically differentiable at that point, when viewed as a function . This is because the complex-differentiability implies that

However, a function  can be differentiable as a multi-variable function, while not being complex-differentiable. For example,  is differentiable at every point, viewed as the 2-variable real function , but it is not complex-differentiable at any point.

Any function that is complex-differentiable in a neighborhood of a point is called holomorphic at that point. Such a function is necessarily infinitely differentiable, and in fact analytic.

Differentiable functions on manifolds

If M is a differentiable manifold, a real or complex-valued function f on M is said to be differentiable at a point p if it is differentiable with respect to some (or any) coordinate chart defined around p. If M and N are differentiable manifolds, a function f: M → N is said to be differentiable at a point p if it is differentiable with respect to some (or any) coordinate charts defined around p and f(p).

See also
 Generalizations of the derivative
 Semi-differentiability
 Differentiable programming

References

Differential calculus
Multivariable calculus
Smooth functions